Bamboo Dam is one of three man-made bodies of fresh water on Great Palm Island, Queensland, Australia, and is located near the peak of Mount Bentley.

See also 
 Solomon Dam

References

External links 
 

Reservoirs in Queensland
Great Palm Island group
Dams in Queensland